Hoplophrys is a monotypic genus of crab in the family Epialtidae. It contains the single species Hoplophrys oatesi, also known as the candy crab, Oates's soft coral crab, commensal soft coral crab and Dendronephthya crab.

Description
Hoplophrys oatesi is a very colourful crab that grows from 1.5 to 2 cm. It lives on various species of soft coral in the genus Dendronephthya. It camouflages itself by mimicking the colours of the polyps among which it hides. It adds further camouflage by attaching polyps to its carapace. Colours vary depending on the colour of the coral, and may be white, pink, yellow or red.

The first pair of legs of this species has small claws. The body has pointed spines with a red and white pattern, similar in appearance to the host coral.

Distribution
This crab is widespread in the Indo-Pacific.

Diet
Hoplophrys oatesi feeds on plankton.

References

Further reading

External links
 
 Image

The Soft Coral Crab is one of many small animals that lives in the ocean. Crabs can come in all shapes and sizes, but this crab is definitely one to remember! With its small size and strange structure, it is by far, one of the most interesting crabs ever seen before. Its colors and the way it protects itself, it is not exactly a normal crab to see in the ocean.

Majoidea
Monotypic arthropod genera
Crustaceans described in 1893